Seetamalakshmi is a 1978 Indian Telugu-language film written and directed by K. Viswanath. The film stars Talluri Rameswari (in her Telugu debut) and Chandra Mohan. It was released on 27 July 1978. It won two state Nandi Awards and a Filmfare Award for Best Actress - Telugu for Talluri Rameswari. Seetamalakshmi was remade in Tamil as Enippadigal (1979), and in Hindi as Sitara (1980).

Plot
Kondayya (Chandra Mohan) and Seetalu (Rameswari) work in a touring theatre in a village and are in love. While essentially illiterate, they love watching movies and learn to recite the film dialogues and songs. A film producer who comes to the village makes a false promise to make Seetalu heroine in his films. Seetalu goes to Hyderabad along with Kondayya. After facing many difficulties, with the help of painter Sridhar, Seetalu finally becomes a heroine. Her success brings her relatives for want of her money. Kondayya slowly realizes that he cannot fit in that cine urban culture. He returns to the village. How the young lovers unite is the rest of the drama.

Credits

Cast
 Talluri Rameswari as Seetalu
 Chandra Mohan as Kondayya
 Sridhar
 Vankayala Satyanarayana as Railway Station Master
 Eeswara Rao
 Dubbing Janaki
 Master Tulasiram as Pallavi
 Master Hari
 Pallavi
 P. L. Narayana
 Sakshi Ranga Rao

Crew
 Director: K. Viswanath
 Assistant Director: Nanduri Vijay
 Producers: Murari – Naidu
 Production Company : Yuva Chitra
 Story: K. Viswanath
 Dialogues: Jandhyala
 Screenplay: K. Viswanath, Jandhyala and K. Murari
 Art Director: Thota Tharani
 Director of Photography: U. Rajagopal
 Film Editing : G. G. Krishna Rao
 Music Director: K. V. Mahadevan
 Assistant Composer: Puhalendi
 Lyrics: Devulapalli Krishnasastri and Veturi
 Playback singers: S. P. Balasubrahmanyam, P. Susheela, G. Anand, Vani Jayaram and Vijayalakshmi Sarma

Soundtrack
 "Chalu Chalu Ee Virasalu" (Lyrics: Devulapalli Krishnasastri; Singers: G. Anand and Vijayalakshmi Sarma
 "Kokoroko Koruko Em Kavalo Koruko" (Lyrics: Veturi; Singers: P. Susheela and S. P. Balasubrahmanyam)
 "Maavi Chigugu Tinagane Kovila Palikena" (Lyrics: Devulapalli Krishnasastri; Singers: P. Susheela and S. P. Balasubrahmanyam)
 "Nuvvitta Nenitta Kookunte Inketta" (Lyrics: Veturi; Singers: P. Susheela and S. P. Balasubrahmanyam)
 "Pade Pade Padutunna Padina Pate" (Lyrics: Veturi; Singer: P. Susheela; Cast: Tulasi)
 "Seetalu Singaram Malacchi Bangaram" (Lyrics: Veturi; Singers: P. Susheela and S. P. Balasubrahmanyam)
 "Ey Pata Ne Padanu Bratuke Pataina Pasivadanu" (Lyrics: Veturi; Singers: P. Susheela, Vani Jayaram and Vijayalakshmi Sarma)

Awards
Nandi Awards - 1978
 Best Child Actress - Baby Thulasi
 Best Lyricist - Devulapalli Krishnasastri

Filmfare Awards South
 Filmfare Award for Best Actress - Telugu - Talluri Rameswari (1978)

References

External links

1978 films
1970s Telugu-language films
Indian drama films
Films set in a movie theatre
Films directed by K. Viswanath
Films scored by K. V. Mahadevan
Telugu films remade in other languages
1978 drama films